Mohamed Mussammil (Mohamadu Mohidin Musammil Mohidi) is a Sri Lankan politician and member of a Parliament of Sri Lanka.

References

Sri Lankan Muslims
Living people
Members of the 13th Parliament of Sri Lanka
Janatha Vimukthi Peramuna politicians
Jathika Nidahas Peramuna politicians
United People's Freedom Alliance politicians
Members of the 16th Parliament of Sri Lanka
1980 births